The 1967–68 SM-sarja season was the 37th season of the SM-sarja, the top level of ice hockey in Finland. 11 teams participated in the league, and Koo-Vee won the championship.

Regular season

External links
 Season on hockeyarchives.info

Fin
Liiga seasons
SM